Musa is a male given name of Semitic origin.

People with the given name 
 Musa al-Hadi, fourth caliph of the Abbasid Caliphate (reigned from 785 to 786)
 Musa ibn Isa ibn Musa al-Hashimi, 8th-century Abbasid governor
 Musa ibn Musa al-Hadi, an Abbasid prince and son of Al-Hadi
 Musa Aman (born 1951), Malaysian politician
 Musa Aydın (born 1980), Turkish footballer
 Musa Beg, official in Safavid Iran
 Musa Çağıran (born 1992), Turkish footballer
 Musa Çelebi, 15th-century Ottoman prince
 Musa Cälil (1906–1944), Soviet poet and World War II resistance fighter
 Musa Ćazim Ćatić (1878–1915), Bosnian poet
 Musa al-Kadhim, seventh imam in Twelver Shia Islam
 Musa McKim (1908–1992), American artist and poet
 Musa Nizam (born 1990), Turkish footballer
 Musa ibn Nusayr (640–716), Yemeni Muslim governor and general under the Umayyads, Viceroy of North Africa since 698; invaded Spain in 711
 Mūsā ibn Shākir, Persian engineer and astronomer
 Musa ibn Musa al-Qasawi, leader of the muwallad Banu Qasi clan
 Musa Hitam, Malaysian politician; former Deputy Prime Minister of Malaysia
 Musa I of Mali, Mansa of the Mali Empire between 1312–37
 Musa Sor, Yazidi saint

People with the surname 
 Ahmed Musa, Nigerian footballer
 Antonius Musa, Roman botanist and physician
 Balkisu Musa (born 1970), Nigerian weightlifter
 Banū Mūsā, 9th century Persian family of scholars
 Igor Musa, Croatian footballer
 Mansa Musa (born 1280), political figure, 10th mansa of the Mali empire (reign 1312–1337)
 Mírzá Músá (died 1887), surnamed Áqáy-i-Kalím, was the brother of Bahá'u'lláh, the founder of the Bahá'í Faith
 Quintus Pomponius Musa, first-century Roman banker and moneyer
 Said Musa, Prime Minister of Belize from 1996 to 2008

See also 
 Musa of Parthia, queen of Parthia c. 2 BC – AD 4
 Musa, a character from Winx Club
 
 Moussa
 Musah (name)

Arabic masculine given names
Bosniak masculine given names
Turkish masculine given names